The 1968–69 NHL season was the 52nd season of the National Hockey League. Twelve teams each played 76 games (two more than in 1967–68). For the second time in a row, the Montreal Canadiens faced the St. Louis Blues in the Stanley Cup finals. Montreal won their second consecutive Stanley Cup as they swept the Blues in four, an identical result to the previous season.

Regular season
Prior to this season no player in NHL history had ever achieved 100 points in a season, but 1968–69 saw three achieve the feat. The Boston Bruins' Phil Esposito led the way with 49 goals and 77 assists for a new record of 126 points, as well as setting a record with linemates Wayne Cashman and Ron Murphy for most points in a season by a forward line. Bobby Hull of Chicago set a new record for goals with 58 and came in second in overall scoring with 107. Gordie Howe of the Detroit Red Wings came in third with 103 points.

Red Berenson came up one goal short of tying an NHL record, scoring six goals for the St. Louis Blues (all against goaltender Doug Favell) in an 8–0 victory over the Philadelphia Flyers on November 7. He became the first player to score a double hat trick in a road game.

Despite finishing last in the West Division, Minnesota was led by rookie left wing Danny Grant, who along with Oakland rookie Norm Ferguson tied Nels Stewart's forty-year-old record for most goals by a rookie with 34.

On December 21, with Montreal goalies Gump Worsley (nervous breakdown) and Rogie Vachon (injured) both unavailable, rookie Tony Esposito and Boston's Gerry Cheevers both achieved shutouts in a rare scoreless tie. Esposito made 41 saves, and Cheevers made 34 saves.

Los Angeles introduced rookie goaltender Gerry Desjardins, who took over the starter's job from Wayne Rutledge, who was bothered by groin injuries most of the season. Desjardins recorded 4 shutouts during the season in helping the Kings make the playoffs and win their first round series over Oakland.

On March 2, Phil Esposito became the first NHL player to score 100 points in a season in a 4–0 win over the Pittsburgh Penguins.

In Boston-Chicago game on March 20, two milestones were accomplished. Bobby Hull broke his own record for goals with his 55th goal, and Bobby Orr broke Flash Hollett's record for goals by a defenceman with his 21st goal.

This would be the last time until the 1997–98 season that the Chicago Black Hawks missed the playoffs.

The league held a beauty pageant for the first time this season, with a contestant from every franchise. Miss Minnesota North Stars Lynn Marie Stewart was named Miss NHL 1968, and was named the NHL "ambassador" for the 1968–69 season, making various appearances and helping to present the Stanley Cup. The league held just two more pageants in 1970 and 1972 before abandoning the concept.

Final standings

Playoffs

Playoff bracket

Quarterfinals

(E1) Montreal Canadiens vs. (E3) New York Rangers
The Montreal Canadiens finished as the best regular season team with 103 points. The New York Rangers earned 91 points to finish third in the East 
Division. This was the ninth playoff series between these two teams, and they split their eight previous series. Their most recent series had come in the 1967 semifinals, which Montreal won in a four-game sweep. New York earned nine of sixteen points in this year's regular season series.

The Canadiens defeated the Rangers in a four-game sweep to advance to the semifinals.

(E2) Boston Bruins v. (E4) Toronto Maple Leafs
The Boston Bruins finished second in the East Division with 100 points. The Toronto Maple Leafs earned 85 points to finish fourth in the East Division. This was the eleventh playoff series between these two teams, with Toronto winning eight of their ten previous series. Their most recent series had come in the 1959 semifinals, where Toronto won in seven games. Boston earned ten of sixteen points in this year's regular season series.

Boston defeated Toronto in a four-game sweep to advance to the semifinals.

(W1) St. Louis Blues vs. (W3) Philadelphia Flyers
The St. Louis Blues finished as West Division champions with 88 points. The Philadelphia Flyers earned 61 points to finish third in the West Division. This was the second playoff series between these two teams, in the second year of existence for both franchises. In the previous year's Stanley Cup Quarterfinals, St. Louis defeated Philadelphia in seven games. St. Louis earned thirteen of sixteen points in this year's regular season series.

St. Louis defeated Philadelphia to advance to the semifinals with the franchise's first four-game sweep.

(W2) Oakland Seals vs. (W4) Los Angeles Kings
The Oakland Seals finished second in the West Division with 69 points to advance to the playoffs for the first time. The Los Angeles Kings earned 58 points to finish fourth in the West Division. This was the first playoff series of the Battle of California. Los Angeles earned ten of sixteen points in this year's regular season series.

The Kings defeated the Seals in the only game seven of the year. Oakland never won another playoff game in franchise history.

Semifinals

(E1) Montreal Canadiens vs. (E2) Boston Bruins
This was the fourteenth playoff series between these two rivals, with Montreal winning eleven of their thirteen previous series. Their most recent series had come in the previous year's quarterfinals, where Montreal won in a four-game sweep. Boston earned ten of sixteen points in this year's regular season series.

The Canadiens defeated the Bruins in six games to advance to their fifth consecutive Stanley Cup final.

(W1) St. Louis Blues vs. (W4) Los Angeles Kings
This was the first playoff series between these two teams. St. Louis earned thirteen of sixteen points in this year's regular season series.

The Blues defeated the Kings in a four-game sweep to continue their undefeated streak in the playoffs, and their streak of never missing a Stanley Cup Final.

Stanley Cup Finals

The Montreal Canadiens advanced to the Stanley Cup Final for the fifth consecutive season, having won three Stanley Cups in the previous four seasons. Overall, it was their twenty-fifth Stanley Cup Final, having won fifteen championships. This was the St. Louis Blues' second appearance in the Final in their second season. The Canadiens had never lost to the Blues going into this series; they went 3-0-1 against St. Louis in the 1967-68 NHL season, 4-0 in the previous year's Stanley Cup Finals, and 5-0-1 in this year's regular season series.

The Montreal Canadiens swept the St. Louis Blues, an outcome identical to the 1968 final.

Awards

All-Star teams

Player statistics

Scoring leaders
Note: GP = Games played, G = Goals, A = Assists, PTS = Points, PIM = Penalties in minutes

Source: NHL.

Leading goaltenders

Note: GP = Games played; Min = Minutes played; GA = Goals against; GAA = Goals against average; W = Wins; L = Losses; T = Ties; SO = Shutouts

Other statistics
 Plus-Minus leader: Bobby Orr, Boston Bruins

1968 Miss NHL Pageant
The 1968 Miss NHL Pageant was the first of three in NHL history and was held in Toronto on June 27, 1968. There were twelve contestants in the pageant, one from each of the twelve NHL teams. The winner would be named Miss NHL 1968 and would be the NHL ambassador for the 1968–69 season.

Miss Minnesota North Stars Lynn Marie Stewart was named Miss NHL 1968, with Miss New York Rangers Donna Hardy the first runner-up, and Miss Los Angeles Kings Julia Martin the second runner-up.  A second-year education student at the University of Minnesota, she received a new 1969 convertible, a trip for two to Mexico, a mink stole, a movie camera and a diamond watch set. Also, she would be the NHL ambassador for the 1968–69 season, making appearances at the NHL All-Star Game, the NHL awards, and the Stanley Cup Finals where she helped NHL President Clarence Campbell present the Stanley Cup. Each contestant received $1,500 in prizes including season tickets to the team that they represented in the pageant. Stewart's prizes were worth $15,000, with those for the first-runner up worth $2,700 and the second runner-up worth $2,200.
Miss Pittsburgh Penguins Karen Antkiewicz was chosen Miss Personality Plus by the other contestants.
Selection of Miss NHL was done on the basis of personality and poise (30 points), carriage and figure (15 points), make-up and grooming (10 points), speech and projection (10 points), talent (10 points) and overall impression (10 points).

Coaches

East
Boston Bruins: Harry Sinden
Chicago Black Hawks: Billy Reay
Detroit Red Wings: Bill Gadsby
Montreal Canadiens: Claude Ruel
New York Rangers: Bernie Geoffrion and Emile Francis
Toronto Maple Leafs: Punch Imlach

West
Los Angeles Kings: Red Kelly
Minnesota North Stars: John Muckler and Wren Blair
Oakland Seals: Fred Glover
Philadelphia Flyers: Keith Allen
Pittsburgh Penguins: George "Red" Sullivan
St. Louis Blues: Scotty Bowman

Debuts
The following is a list of players of note who played their first NHL game in 1968–69 (listed with their first team, asterisk(*) marks debut in playoffs):
Bob Berry, Montreal Canadiens
Guy Lapointe, Montreal Canadiens
Jude Drouin, Montreal Canadiens
Tony Esposito, Montreal Canadiens
Brad Park, New York Rangers
Pat Quinn, Toronto Maple Leafs
Jean Pronovost, Pittsburgh Penguins

Last games
The following is a list of players of note that played their last game in the NHL in 1968–69 (listed with their last team):
Kenny Wharram, Chicago Black Hawks
Kent Douglas, Detroit Red Wings
Gilles Tremblay, Montreal Canadiens
Allan Stanley, Philadelphia Flyers
Billy Harris, Pittsburgh Penguins
Doug Harvey, St. Louis Blues
Pierre Pilote, Toronto Maple Leafs

See also 
 1968–69 NHL transactions
 List of Stanley Cup champions
 1968 NHL Amateur Draft
 22nd National Hockey League All-Star Game
 National Hockey League All-Star Game
 1968 in sports
 1969 in sports

References
 
 
 
 
 

Notes

External links
Hockey Database
NHL.com
hickoksports.com

 
1968–69 in American ice hockey by league
1968–69 in Canadian ice hockey by league